Saray (also Romanized as Sarāy, Sarai, and Seray) is a village in Bedevostan-e Gharbi Rural District, Khvajeh District, Heris County, East Azerbaijan Province, Iran. At the 2006 census, its population was 1,501, in 342 families.

References 

Populated places in Heris County